Montanari is an Italian surname meaning mountaineer or highlander. Its highest concentration occurs in the region of Emilia Romagna. Notable people with the surname include:

 Antonio Montanari, Italian violinist and composer
 Christian Montanari, Sammarinese racing car driver
 Geminiano Montanari, Italian astronomer
 Giuseppe Montanari, Italian painter
 Marcello Montanari, Italian professional football 
 Massimo Montanari, professor or Medieval History at Bologna University and writer on the history and culture of food
 Richard Montanari, American crime writer 
 Wolfango Montanari, Italian former sprinter

References

Italian toponymic surnames
Italian-language surnames